The Institute of Healthcare Engineering and Estate Management (IHEEM) is the UK's largest specialist Institute for the Healthcare Estates Sector; devoted to developing careers, provision of education and training and registering engineers as Eng Tech, IEng and CEng.

History
The Institute was founded in 1943 and was originally named the Institute of Hospital Engineers; the Society of X-Ray Technology had merged with this in 1990.

Structure
It is headquartered in the Cumberland Business Centre in Portsmouth, on the A2030.

IHEEM:
 is a not-for-profit company. Their primary purpose, as a professional development organisation, is to keep members up to date with developing technology and changing regulations within the industry
 is independent of government, the NHS and commercial interests and protects its impartiality and objectivity.

IHEEM’s members comply with a Code of Professional Conduct that places a personal obligation to uphold the dignity and reputation of the profession and to safeguard public interest; each member undertakes to exercise all reasonable professional skill and care and to discharge this responsibility with integrity.

The Institute counts among its members employees of both public and private healthcare providers, engineering and consultancy firms and practices. Increasingly members come from a non-engineering background, many with Facilities Management experience.

See also 
 Chartered engineer
 Incorporated engineer
 Engineering technician

References

External links 
 Institute of Healthcare Engineering and Estate Management

1943 establishments in the United Kingdom
ECUK Licensed Members
Engineering societies based in the United Kingdom
Medical physics organizations
Organisations based in Portsmouth
Science and technology in Hampshire
Medical and health organisations based in the United Kingdom